Parliamentary elections were held in North Korea on 8 March 2009 to elect the members of the 12th Supreme People's Assembly. They were originally scheduled to be held in August 2008 but were postponed for unknown reasons. Observers of North Korea speculated that it was in relation to Kim Jong-il's ill health.

All candidates standing in the elections in North Korea were members of one of the parties comprising the Democratic Front for the Reunification of the Fatherland. A single candidate, approved by the North-Korean leadership, ran in each of the 687 districts, thereby guaranteeing a full victory by the Democratic Front for the Reunification of the Fatherland, regardless of voter turnout. Kim Jong-il, the de facto leader of North Korea and the Chairman of the National Defence Commission, ran for election in Constituency 333.

Background
The 11th Supreme People's Assembly was dissolved and elections were called for North Korea's 687 electoral districts on January 7, 2009. The elections were to be originally held as per North Korea's constitution in August 2008.

The delay was not officially explained, but was believed to be related to the health of Kim Jong-il. The elections also come after a significant cabinet shuffle in recent months that saw the replacement of at least five members of cabinet. The elections were called for March 8, 2009 allowing leave for a 60-day campaign period.

After dissolution, nominating committees in all 687 districts nominated Kim Jong-il to stand for election. The 333rd district was the first to file their nomination, so he decided to run in that district. In the previous assembly, Kim Jong-il represented the 649th election district.

Electoral system
Voter registration was conducted by the Resident Registration Bureaus of the National Security Agency. Completing the lists of voters also had the side effect of discovering missing residents who might have defected and left the country. Allegations had surfaced of bribes being paid to officials conducting registration drives to declare family members who have defected as being deceased. The voter registration deadline for the election took place on March 4, 2009.

The bribes themselves have been overlooked by the National Security Agency as the North Korean government demands the lists be complete to ensure that there is 100% turnout in the vote. It is easier to explain missing persons as being dead than to have an incomplete list of voters.

The voting for deputies of the Supreme People's Assembly in 2009 consisted of using paper ballots containing the name of a single candidate nominated in each district. To indicate support for the candidate, a ballot was dropped into the box unmarked. If the voter did not support a candidate, that voter had to cross out the name of the candidate before dropping the ballot.

The voting method was a departure from prior elections. In previous elections, the system consisted of two ballot boxes at each polling station. The boxes, one black and one white, were to indicate support for or against a candidate. There was no system in place to handle absentee ballots for North Koreans living abroad and there did not appear to be a system of advanced voting in place. Proxy votes were ordered to be cast by family members of North Korean defectors who were detained in prisons within China. All voting and the validation of official returns was overseen by the Central Election Committee.

Voting was supposed to be a secret process, but with the method of casting ballots, it became obvious who was opposed to the candidates. The voter had the option of going to a booth to cross out the name or dropping the ballot directly in the box. Penalties for voting against a candidate or not voting were severe. Electors who refused to vote were sent to labor camps. A member of the National Security Agency was stationed at every polling station to keep an eye out for people who used or looked at the red pen.

Conduct

Election day began with editorials being published in all state run media, encouraging voter participation. Voting officially began at 9:00am local time. Mobile polling stations were dispatched to infirm residents who could not travel to polling stations to cast ballots. Citizens of foreign nations resident in North Korea were also encouraged to come out and cast a ballot if they so wished.

By noon on election day, the Korean Central News Agency had reported that 71% of registered North Korean voters had turned out to cast ballots.

Voters in North Korea had dressed up for election day, wearing suits and chosŏn-ot, traditional Korean dresses.

The most watched race of the election was district 333 where leader Kim Jong-il was running. On March 9, 2009, North Korean media announced that Kim Jong-il was unanimously re-elected to parliament. The election committee also stated that 99.98% of all registered voters took part in voting, with 100% voting for their candidate in each district.

The election was a largely peaceful event, but some vandalism of candidate posters, along with anti-election graffiti, occurred in Mundeuk, South Pyongan Province. Signage had also been changed on polling stations, as official signage was replaced with new signs misspelling "election booth."

Peter Hughes, the British ambassador to North Korea, garnered significant outrage and controversy from around the world after he blogged about the election having a festive atmosphere. The outrage was caused by claims that his blog read more like an official North Korean press release as he did not mention in his blog the negative aspects of the election, such as citizens being forced to vote and that there was only a single candidate to vote for.

Results
Official election results were announced by the Central Election Commission on March 2009. The official results showed 324 of the 687 Deputies had been replaced and were new to power with the rest being re-elected.  A large portion of the Deputies elected were to fill vacancies from those who died. No form of appointment or by-elections currently exists to put Deputies into the Supreme Peoples Assembly between elections.

Elected members
The following were elected as members of parliament:

 Electoral District: Ri Ul-sol
 Electoral District: Kim Yong-bok
 Electoral District: Kim Kyong-hui
 Electoral District: Kang Jun-ho
 Electoral District: Kim Yong-nam
 Electoral District: Im Man-soon
 Electoral District: Ryoo Chung-ryol
 Electoral District: Kim Bok-nam
 Electoral District: Hong So-hon
 Electoral District: Tak Hua-suk
 Electoral District: Mun Sang-min
 Electoral District: Ri Tong-chan
 Electoral District: Mun Son-bul
 Electoral District: Kim Sok-nam
 Electoral District: Sin Yong-chol
 Electoral District: Pak Pong-nam
 Electoral District: Pak Kyu-hong
 Electoral District: Cho Myong-lok
 Electoral District: Kim In-nam
 Electoral District: Ri Jae-kang
 Electoral District: Kim Kwang-chul
 Electoral District: Kim Yong-ju
 Electoral District: Choe Hong-Il
 Electoral District: Ho Jong-suk
 Electoral District: Kim Kyong-su
 Electoral District: Kim Song-hi
 Electoral District: Ri Myung-ok
 Electoral District: Song Chun-sik
 Electoral District: Yuk Sok-chon
 Electoral District: Hwang Kil-chol
 Electoral District: Jang Song-thaek
 Electoral District: Ri Kyong-il
 Electoral District: Kim Ung-kwan
 Electoral District: Kim Dong-pyut
 Electoral District: Byon Sseub-ho
 Electoral District: Ri Yong-mu
 Electoral District: Ri Sun-im
 Electoral District: Kim Song-hui
 Electoral District: Jong Dong-du
 Electoral District: Song Ja-reeb
 Electoral District: Yun Ki-jong
 Electoral District: O Kuk-ryol
 Electoral District: Kang Nam-ik
 Electoral District: Jon Kyong-su
 Electoral District: Kim Yong-nam
 Electoral District: Ri Kun-il
 Electoral District: Pak Kwan-o
 Electoral District: Kang Son-ju
 Electoral District: Kim Myong-hwan
 Electoral District: Byun Yong-reeb
 Electoral District: Jong Kwang-hyuk
 Electoral District: Jong Dal-son
 Electoral District: Kim Hua-suk
 Electoral District: Jong Hyon-yong
 Electoral District: Ri Yong-chol
 Electoral District: Kim Sae-myong
 Electoral District: Kim Ki-nam
 Electoral District: Kim Ho Jae
 Electoral District: Han Jong-hyuk
 Electoral District: Kim Bok-sil
 Electoral District: Kim Kyong-ok
 Electoral District: Pak Hui-kwan
 Electoral District: Riu Mi-yong
 Electoral District: Jon Hui-suk
 Electoral District: Jo Yon-jae
 Electoral District: Kim Song-kyu
 Electoral District: Kim Yang-gon
 Electoral District: Kang Ki-som
 Electoral District: Ri Hua-sil
 Electoral District: Ri Sung-ho
 Electoral District: Pak Jin-sik
 Electoral District: Rho Jong-nam
 Electoral District: Choe Ik-kyu
 Electoral District: Jon Jin-suh
 Electoral District: Kim Kuk-tae
 Electoral District: Ho Song-kil
 Electoral District: Noh Kwang-chol
 Electoral District: Hui Yong-ae
 Electoral District: Kim Yu-ho
 Electoral District: Kim Jong-su
 Electoral District: Lim Nam-su
 Electoral District: Ri Ung-chan
 Electoral District: Kim Jong-lin
 Electoral District: Ri Yong-chol
 Electoral District: An In-Kon
 Electoral District: Ri Jae-il
 Electoral District: Jang Chul
 Electoral District: So Ju-chong
 Electoral District: Pak Kil-nam
 Electoral District: Kim Bong-sil
 Electoral District: Kim Si-hak
 Electoral District: Ri Kil-song
 Electoral District: Ri Ryong-nam
 Electoral District: Sin O-sun
 Electoral District: Han Chol
 Electoral District: Kim Chol-min
 Electoral District: Kim Yong-dae
 Electoral District: Jong Myong-sun
 Electoral District: Jae Hui-jong
 Electoral District: Kim Yong-il
 Electoral District: Kim Duk-sam
 Electoral District: Pak Nam-ki
 Electoral District: Kil Chol-hyuk
 Electoral District: La Dong-hui
 Electoral District: Yang Hyong-sop
 Electoral District: Kim Sun-hua
 Electoral District: Ha Ung-chun
 Electoral District: Im Jong-sil
 Electoral District: Cha Sung-suh
 Electoral District: Kim Myong-hak
 Electoral District: Ryang Jang-kyun
 Electoral District: Kim Yong-song
 Electoral District: Jong Myong-jo
 Electoral District: Ji Dong-sik
 Electoral District: Min Kyong-nam
 Electoral District: Hong Kwang-il
 Electoral District: Kim Jong-suk
 Electoral District: Jin Yong-il
 Electoral District: Kim Hyoung-nam
 Electoral District: Kim Ui-sun
 Electoral District: Kim Ki-ryong
 Electoral District: Han Jong-hua
 Electoral District: Ro Song-sil
 Electoral District: Kim Huan-suh
 Electoral District: Ri Kwang-ho
 Electoral District: Choe Yong-rim
 Electoral District: Pak Yong-sun
 Electoral District: Koh Myong-hui
 Electoral District: Yu Jang-sok
 Electoral District: Kim Yong-gil
 Electoral District: Lim Don-hua
 Electoral District: Choe Ryong-ik
 Electoral District: Ju Myong-son
 Electoral District: Pak Sun-nyo
 Electoral District: Yu Pom-sun
 Electoral District: Jon Il-chun
 Electoral District: Paek Song-nam
 Electoral District: Choe-Ung-kwon
 Electoral District: Jo Kyong-chil
 Electoral District: Hwang Hak-won
 Electoral District: Chae Jang-dong
 Electoral District: Kim Kyong-son
 Electoral District: Kim Kwang-yon
 Electoral District: Kim Kum-suk
 Electoral District: Pak Chun-dam
 Electoral District: Jon Yong-sik
 Electoral District: Ri Kyong-ryol
 Electoral District: Kim Jong-myong
 Electoral District: Ri Man-ho
 Electoral District: Kim Sun-jib
 Electoral District: Hyon Sok-kil
 Electoral District: Kim Ki-kun
 Electoral District: Kim Kwang-yong
 Electoral District: Pak Yun-il
 Electoral District: Kim Ok-ryon
 Electoral District: Moon Myong-hak
 Electoral District: Kim Jong-im
 Electoral District: Kwong Hyuk-bong
 Electoral District: Kim Dok-il
 Electoral District: Jang Ung
 Electoral District: Choe Ji-son
 Electoral District: Pyo Hui-song
 Electoral District: Yong Man-sik
 Electoral District: Kil Lyae-suh
 Electoral District: Kim Hyo
 Electoral District: Kim Yong-hua
 Electoral District: Kim Hong-kon
 Electoral District: Ryang Suh-jong
 Electoral District: Sin Ung-sik
 Electoral District: Ri Sung-ho
 Electoral District: Kim Yong-il
 Electoral District: Kim Yon-hua
 Electoral District: Ri Nyong-kun
 Electoral District: Jo Won-taek
 Electoral District: Kim Myong-il
 Electoral District: Choe Jong-ryul
 Electoral District: Kim Chol-ung
 Electoral District: Hyon Ung-sil
 Electoral District: Kim Myong-hui
 Electoral District: Kim Hyong-sik
 Electoral District: Sin An-son
 Electoral District: Ho Thaek
 Electoral District: An Kuk-thae
 Electoral District: Ro Tu-chol
 Electoral District: Lee Kyo-man
 Electoral District: Ko Chang-suh
 Electoral District: Son Suk-kun
 Electoral District: Won Jong-sam
 Electoral District: Jon Chang-rim
 Electoral District: So Lan-hui
 Electoral District: Ri Hak-song
 Electoral District: Kim Jae-hua
 Electoral District: Kim Jong-kil
 Electoral District: Han Uh-chol
 Electoral District: Lo Bae-kwon
 Electoral District: Kim Bong-suh
 Electoral District: Jang Man-chol
 Electoral District: Ri Ju-o
 Electoral District: Kim Hyae-yong
 Electoral District: Pak Jong-kun
 Electoral District: Choe Chil-nam
 Electoral District: Kang Ryon-hak
 Electoral District: Sin Jae-won
 Electoral District: Ri Myong-chol
 Electoral District: Kim Yong-sun
 Electoral District: Song Kwong-chol
 Electoral District: Kwak Chol-ho
 Electoral District: Mun Bong-ryong
 Electoral District: Choe Yong-dok
 Electoral District: Kim Hua-yong
 Electoral District: Pak Kyong-sam
 Electoral District: An Dong-chun
 Electoral District: Kim Jae-ryong
 Electoral District: Ho Sang-jong
 Electoral District: Kim Chang-jon
 Electoral District: Kim Jong
 Electoral District: Jon Yong-son
 Electoral District: O Ik-jae
 Electoral District: Ri Hong-sam
 Electoral District: Pak Myong-hun
 Electoral District: Kim Hui-suk
 Electoral District: Kim Ik-chol
 Electoral District: Ri Yong Jun
 Electoral District: Pak Myong-son
 Electoral District: Pak Hak-son
 Electoral District: Jon Kyong-son
 Electoral District: Kim In-sun
 Electoral District: Choe Kwong-chol
 Electoral District: Kim Hak-chol
 Electoral District: Hong Son-ok
 Electoral District: Jong Myong-hak
 Electoral District: Kim Kum-sil
 Electoral District: Kim Jong-hyup
 Electoral District: Kim Dang-suh
 Electoral District: Paek Bok-nam
 Electoral District: Kim Byong-ryul
 Electoral District: Cha Myong-ok
 Electoral District: Kim Kyo-kwon
 Electoral District: Choe Hyuk-chol
 Electoral District: Jang Jae-an
 Electoral District: Ryang Kyong-bok
 Electoral District: Tong Jong-ho
 Electoral District: Ho Jong-ok
 Electoral District: Ri Chol-man
 Electoral District: So Chun-yong
 Electoral District: Kim Pyong-hae
 Electoral District: Pak Chun-kon
 Electoral District: Kang Nung-su
 Electoral District: Thae Hyong-chol
 Electoral District: Yun Dong-hyon
 Electoral District: Uh Sun-yong
 Electoral District: Kim Byong-hun
 Electoral District: Han Byong-man
 Electoral District: Ri Ki-suh
 Electoral District: Jong Son-mun
 Electoral District: Pak Song-sil
 Electoral District: Suh Un-ki
 Electoral District: Ri Kyong-bom
 Electoral District: Kim Uh-chol
 Electoral District: Kim Bong-il
 Electoral District: Kim Yun-sok
 Electoral District: Jon Ho-chol
 Electoral District: Jo Song-yun
 Electoral District: An Yong-hyun
 Electoral District: Jim Kyong-hui
 Electoral District: Ri Sang-kun
 Electoral District: O Ung-chang
 Electoral District: Ri Kwong-kon
 Electoral District: So Sung-chol
 Electoral District: Yun Chol-yong
 Electoral District: Kim Kwong-lin
 Electoral District: Ri Yong-min
 Electoral District: An Min-chol
 Electoral District: Mun Jae-chol
 Electoral District: Jong Yong-suh
 Electoral District: Yo Min-hyon
 Electoral District: Kim Byong-hua
 Electoral District: Jong Ok-dong
 Electoral District: Kang Chu-ryon
 Electoral District: Kim Young-kil
 Electoral District: Ri Hui-chon
 Electoral District: An Min-hul
 Electoral District: Ri Jong-kuk
 Electoral District: Pak Jong-jin
 Electoral District: Jong Chang-ryol
 Electoral District: An Sung-ok
 Electoral District: Kang Yong-sop
 Electoral District: Pak Chun-sam
 Electoral District: Kim Ung-chol
 Electoral District: Kang Kil-yong
 Electoral District: Paek Nam-il
 Electoral District: Kim Yong-ho
 Electoral District: Hong Kum-son
 Electoral District: Hong Chol-soo
 Electoral District: Ji Sang-min
 Electoral District: Hwang Yun-nam
 Electoral District: Ryo Won-ku
 Electoral District: Kang Chang-uk
 Electoral District: Kim Il-ho
 Electoral District: Kye Yong-sam
 Electoral District: Pak Sun-hui
 Electoral District: Mun Ung-jo
 Electoral District: Ho Nam-sun
 Electoral District: Sun Kyong-nam
 Electoral District: Kim Chun-ryo
 Electoral District: Kim Dong-jin
 Electoral District: Ri Su-yong
 Electoral District: Ri Jong-mu
 Electoral District: Yun Yang-kyun
 Electoral District: Jo Kum-suk
 Electoral District: Jin Sang-chol
 Electoral District: Kim Rak-hui
 Electoral District: Jo Il-ki
 Electoral District: Ko In-ho
 Electoral District: Kim Ok-kyu
 Electoral District: Yun Ryang-sok
 Electoral District: Choe Yong-nam
 Electoral District: Ku Myong-ok
 Electoral District: Kim Chang-sik
 Electoral District: Ri Tae-sik
 Electoral District: Kwon Tae-mun
 Electoral District: Shin Son-ho
 Electoral District: An Chun-sop
 Electoral District: Kim Yoo-kun
 Electoral District: Choe Eun
 Electoral District: Ri Chun-hui
 Electoral District: Song Hyo-nam
 Electoral District: Pak Song-ho
 Electoral District: Ri Byong-chol
 Electoral District: Cha Jun-sik
 Electoral District: Shim Jae-ul
 Electoral District: Choe Young-ho
 Electoral District: Kim Jong-il
 Electoral District: Kim Jong-kwan
 Electoral District: Kim Yoo-ho
 Electoral District: Song Jun-taek
 Electoral District: Han Sang-sun
 Electoral District: Jong Myong-do
 Electoral District: Pak Won-sik
 Electoral District: Kim Jong-gak
 Electoral District: Kim Jin-chol
 Electoral District: Jun Il
 Electoral District: Kim Myong-kuk
 Electoral District: O Kwang-sik
 Electoral District: Ju Jong-kyong
 Electoral District: Jo Kyong-chol
 Electoral District: Ri Yong Kil
 Electoral District: Kim Yong-chun
 Electoral District: Ho Song-il
 Electoral District: Kim Kwan-chol
 Electoral District: Kim Kum-chol
 Electoral District: Han Jong-jin
 Electoral District: Kim Chol
 Electoral District: Ri Song-guk
 Electoral District: Byon In-son
 Electoral District: Kim Kwong-il
 Electoral District: Pak Sung-won
 Electoral District: Ri Song-bok
 Electoral District: Jae Mun-sok
 Electoral District: Lim Kong-yun
 Electoral District: Hyon Yong-chol
 Electoral District: Choe Bu-gil
 Electoral District: Ju Sun-chol
 Electoral District: Ri Jong-bu
 Electoral District: Yun Kyong-so
 Electoral District: Kim Chun-sam
 Electoral District: Ju Song-nam
 Electoral District: Choe Song-un
 Electoral District: Ri Si-joong
 Electoral District: Kim Kwang-hyon
 Electoral District: Chon Jae-kwon
 Electoral District: Kim Won-hong
 Electoral District: Kim Bae-jong
 Electoral District: Ri Yong-ho
 Electoral District: Ri Song-sun
 Electoral District: Hyon Chol-hae
 Electoral District: Pak Dong-hak
 Electoral District: Yon Hak-song
 Electoral District: Yon Jong-lin
 Electoral District: Kim Song-dok
 Electoral District: Ri Kuk-jun
 Electoral District: Kim Yong-jom
 Electoral District: Ju Sang-song
 Electoral District: Ji Yong-chun
 Electoral District: Kim Jong-ho
 Electoral District: Kim Chong-sup
 Electoral District: U Tong-chuk
 Electoral District: Ryu Kyong
 Electoral District: Paek Sol
 Electoral District: Song Yun-hui
 Electoral District: Bong Chan-ho
 Electoral District: Jong Myong-sil
 Electoral District: Jo Hae-suk
 Electoral District: Jo Hae-suk
 Electoral District: Choe Thae-bok
 Electoral District: Chae Kang-hwan
 Electoral District: Kwak Pom-gi
 Electoral District: Kim Chung-kal
 Electoral District: Pak Jae-pil
 Electoral District: Kim Chol-kuk
 Electoral District: Ryang Hui-chol
 Electoral District: Hwang Sun-hui
 Electoral District: Ko Kyu-il
 Electoral District: La Chang-ryol
 Electoral District: Ri Chol-ho
 Electoral District: Lo Ik-hua
 Electoral District: Ri Won-il
 Electoral District: Kim Yong-ae
 Electoral District: Choe Song-won
 Electoral District: Kang Min-chol
 Electoral District: Choe Jang-son
 Electoral District: Lim Song-bok
 Electoral District: Kim Mu-jon
 Electoral District: Kim Jong-ok
 Electoral District: Ho Jong-man
 Electoral District: Ri Sae-yuk
 Electoral District: Han Dong-kun
 Electoral District: Ri Song-chol
 Electoral District: Ko Byong-som
 Electoral District: Min Dong-sik
 Electoral District: Choe Han-chun
 Electoral District: Ri Song-ho
 Electoral District: Liu Myong-kum
 Electoral District: Hwang In-bom
 Electoral District: Choe Ryong-hae
 Electoral District: Choe Yong-son
 Electoral District: Ri Sung-jin
 Electoral District: Pak Myong-sik
 Electoral District: Kim Hui-bong
 Electoral District: Kim Ji-song
 Electoral District: Ri Song-kwan
 Electoral District: Ri Chol-ho
 Electoral District: Pak Ui-chun
 Electoral District: Choe Kwang-chol
 Electoral District: Pak Yong-pal
 Electoral District: Ri Chun-il
 Electoral District: Ju Jin-kuh
 Electoral District: Hwang Bong-yong
 Electoral District: Ri Chol (Ri Su-yong)
 Electoral District: Ri Jong-hyuk
 Electoral District: An Kyong-ho
 Electoral District: Ri Kyo-sang
 Electoral District: Ri Chon-bok
 Electoral District: Sok Yon-su
 Electoral District: Han Song-chol
 Electoral District: Kim Dong-un
 Electoral District: Jon Byong-ho
 Electoral District: Kwak Yong-nam
 Electoral District: Choe Song-kon
 Electoral District: Kim Hae-lin
 Electoral District: Kim Kwong-ju
 Electoral District: Ju Byong-ju
 Electoral District: Paek Se-bong
 Electoral District: Kim Chol
 Electoral District: Son Yong-ung
 Electoral District: Jo Sae-yong
 Electoral District: Kang Jong-nam
 Electoral District: An Sung-hui
 Electoral District: Choe Chan-kon
 Electoral District: Kim Chun-il
 Electoral District: Jong Chun-sil
 Electoral District: Ju Kyu-chang
 Electoral District: Lyom Hui-ryong
 Electoral District: Pak To-chun
 Electoral District: Sin Kwan-jin
 Electoral District: Lo Hae-sun
 Electoral District: Kim Chae-lan
 Electoral District: Kim Kwang-chol
 Electoral District: Lyom In-yun
 Electoral District: Ri Chang-han
 Electoral District: Choe Ki-ryong
 Electoral District: Ri Sung-kwan
 Electoral District: Kim In-nam
 Electoral District: Pak Kum-hui
 Electoral District: Lim Yong-hua
 Electoral District: Kang Byong-hu
 Electoral District: Ri Yong-don
 Electoral District: Sim Sang-dae
 Electoral District: Kim Ryong-sil
 Electoral District: Ri Jong-suk
 Electoral District: Kim Du-hyon
 Electoral District: Byon Ung-kyu
 Electoral District: Hong Sok-jin
 Electoral District: Kim Won-il
 Electoral District: So Man-sul
 Electoral District: Lyu Yong-som
 Electoral District: Kim Kwong-il
 Electoral District: Han Won-il
 Electoral District: Kim Yon-hyuk
 Electoral District: Ri Il-som
 Electoral District: Kwon Kum-ryong
 Electoral District: Kim Jin-kyu
 Electoral District: Kim Jong-sim
 Electoral District: Uh Du-tae
 Electoral District: Ji Jong-kwan
 Electoral District: Kim Yong-sik
 Electoral District: Choe Hui-chong
 Electoral District: So Jong-dok
 Electoral District: Sin Tae-song
 Electoral District: Son Kum-hwal
 Electoral District: Jon Song-ung
 Electoral District: Kim Yong-chae
 Electoral District: Kim In-bok
 Electoral District: Jo Chung-han
 Electoral District: O Kwang-chol
 Electoral District: Sim Sang-jin
 Electoral District: O Ryong-il
 Electoral District: Ri Hwan-ki
 Electoral District: Mun Yong-chol
 Electoral District: Ri Chol-pong
 Electoral District: Sim Il-chol
 Electoral District: Bae Myong-sik
 Electoral District: Kang Pil-hun
 Electoral District: Kim Hong-su
 Electoral District: Pak Jae-kyong
 Electoral District: Choe Yong-hyuk
 Electoral District: Kim Il-chol
 Electoral District: Paek Jong-sun
 Electoral District: Han Chun-sik
 Electoral District: Ri Song-ho
 Electoral District: Choe Jin-su
 Electoral District: Kim Song-hun
 Electoral District: Kim Hyon-jin
 Electoral District: Kim Tae-son
 Electoral District: Sim Jong-taek
 Electoral District: Jong Sun-kum
 Electoral District: Choe Jong-sik
 Electoral District: Kim Pung-ki
 Electoral District: Kim Chol-won
 Electoral District: Sok Won-chun
 Electoral District: Song Kwang-dok
 Electoral District: Kim Su-jo
 Electoral District: Jang Byong-tae
 Electoral District: Nam Yong-hal
 Electoral District: Kang Hyong-pyo
 Electoral District: Kim Ki-uh
 Electoral District: Jong Yong-chol
 Electoral District: Yu Kyong-hak
 Electoral District: Kim Sung-chol
 Electoral District: JongYong-kil
 Electoral District: Kim Sok-sun
 Electoral District: Ri Jong-son
 Electoral District: Ri Chong-hua
 Electoral District: Sin Byong-kang
 Electoral District: Kim Sung-nam
 Electoral District: Ri Yong-chol
 Electoral District: Ri Yong-ae
 Electoral District: Ri Yong-su
 Electoral District: Kim Song-ki
 Electoral District: Bee Dal-sun
 Electoral District: Mun Yong-son
 Electoral District: Chu Yong-suk
 Electoral District: Ri Chu-ok
 Electoral District: Jon Kil-su
 Electoral District: Yu Kyong-suk
 Electoral District: Ri Hyo-son
 Electoral District: Liu Kyong-ok
 Electoral District: Jong Dok-yong
 Electoral District: Pak In-ju
 Electoral District: Kim Man-sang
 Electoral District: Ri Kwang-nam
 Electoral District: Ho Hak
 Electoral District: Jong Byong-kun
 Electoral District: Jong Myong-hak
 Electoral District: Choe Hyon
 Electoral District: Ju Sung-sun
 Electoral District: Kong Sung-il
 Electoral District: Ri Mu-yong
 Electoral District: Kim Chol-yong
 Electoral District: Min Byong-chol
 Electoral District: Kim Pong-chol
 Electoral District: Km Din-ku
 Electoral District: Sin Chol-ho
 Electoral District: Kim Hua-wal
 Electoral District: Jon Dee-won
 Electoral District: Ri Jae-son
 Electoral District: Song Chun-som
 Electoral District: Ri Ho-lim
 Electoral District: Pak Thae-won
 Electoral District: Sun Hyon-nom
 Electoral District: Pak Yong-lee
 Electoral District: O Ryong-deek
 Electoral District: Kim Su-gil
 Electoral District: O Su-yong
 Electoral District: Jo Myong-rok
 Electoral District: Kim Won-su
 Electoral District: Han Jong-bin
 Electoral District: Jon Ku-kang
 Electoral District: Ko Son-ok
 Electoral District: Song Yong-sin
 Electoral District: Jong Mun-su
 Electoral District: Choe In-ho
 Electoral District: Jon Hae-song
 Electoral District: Kim Byong-pal
 Electoral District: Hong Song-nam
 Electoral District: Ri Mun-yong
 Electoral District: Pak Chang-dok
 Electoral District: Lio Chun-sok
 Electoral District: Jyo Bong-chun
 Electoral District: Jang Chun-kun
 Electoral District: Ri Mun-bong
 Electoral District: Kim Jae-dong
 Electoral District: Hwang Yong-sam
 Electoral District: Kim Kwang-suk
 Electoral District: Kim Chong-sun
 Electoral District: Choe Kwan-su
 Electoral District: Ri Chol-ho
 Electoral District: Hwang Kang-chol
 Electoral District: Kim Kum-ok
 Electoral District: Jong Yong-su
 Electoral District: Kang Yong-tae
 Electoral District: Kim Song-ho
 Electoral District: Kim Yong-chol
 Electoral District: Jo Sun-sil
 Electoral District: Cha Kyong-il
 Electoral District: Ja Chong-kun
 Electoral District: Bang Kwan-bok
 Electoral District: Li Tae-som
 Electoral District: Pak Song-ki
 Electoral District: Kim Yong-jin
 Electoral District: Kim Ryong-kun
 Electoral District: Ha Sae-un
 Electoral District: Song Sun-lyo
 Electoral District: Yun Byong-sok
 Electoral District: Pak Hui-dok
 Electoral District: Choe Kwan-chun
 Electoral District: Dong Hun
 Electoral District: O Sae-kwan
 Electoral District: Kim Chun-kum
 Electoral District: Tae Jong-hon
 Electoral District: Li Jong-sik
 Electoral District: Kim Tae-bong
 Electoral District: Kim Chol-ho
 Electoral District: Li Kwang-nam
 Electoral District: Song Ryong-su
 Electoral District: Ju Chun-som
 Electoral District: Kim Min-suk
 Electoral District: Ko Ki-hon
 Electoral District: Jon Song-ho
 Electoral District: Kim Yong-song
 Electoral District: Song Kum-ok
 Electoral District: Kim Hyong-chan
 Electoral District: Jo Chang-bam
 Electoral District: Ryang Yong-ho
 Electoral District: Jon Sung-hun
 Electoral District: Choe Kil-ju
 Electoral District: Pyo Il-sok
 Electoral District: Jin Byong-som
 Electoral District: Ro Song-ung
 Electoral District: Hwang Min
 Electoral District: Ri Ku-ok
 Electoral District: Song Jong-hui
 Electoral District: Hong Sok-hyong
 Electoral District: Kim Song-jong
 Electoral District: Kim Son-won
 Electoral District: Kim Chong-sik
 Electoral District: Jon Kwang-lok
 Electoral District: Sok Kil-ho
 Electoral District: Kim Myong-sok
 Electoral District: Pak Su-kil
 Electoral District: Pak Dong-jun
 Electoral District: Jong Yong-son
 Electoral District: Pak Song-nam
 Electoral District: Pak Kwang-chol
 Electoral District: Ri Yong-jin
 Electoral District: Hong Lin-som
 Electoral District: Kim Su-yol
 Electoral District: Kim Myong-hui
 Electoral District: Han Myong-song
 Electoral District: Choe Sae-kwan
 Electoral District: Pak Chol-ho
 Electoral District: So Hong-chan
 Electoral District: Jong Hyong-suk
 Electoral District: Ri Bong-juk
 Electoral District: Jang In-suk
 Electoral District: Ri Il-nam
 Electoral District: Kim Kyong-ho
 Electoral District: Kim Hyong-dok
 Electoral District: Kim Dong-il
 Electoral District: Jang Byong-kwan
 Electoral District: An Mun-hak
 Electoral District: Kim Chol
 Electoral District: Choe Ki-jun
 Electoral District: Om Ha-jin
 Electoral District: Yon Tae-jong
 Electoral District: Song Jong-su
 Electoral District: Han Myong-kuk

Reactions
The 2009 election in North Korea garnered significant attention from media agencies around the world. The attention was primarily to see if the potentially named successor to Kim Jong-il, Kim Jong-un, was standing for a seat to the Supreme People's Assembly. Rumors surfaced in the world media on 8 March 2009 that Kim Jong-un, the youngest son of Kim Jong-il, appeared on the ballot for the elections to the Supreme People's Assembly. The rumors also stated that following the election the new parliament "may also replace members of [Kim's] cabinet and the National Defense Commission, the top ruling agency."

The Central Election Commission, via the Korean Central News Agency, released the complete list of Deputies elected to the Supreme People's Assembly. The list showed that Kim Jong-un was not among those who were elected. The results left watchers of the regime in North Korea guessing as to the political future of the country.

References

External links
Full list of candidates
 Reported results of the election of deputies 

Elections in North Korea
North Korea
Parliamentary
Supreme People's Assembly
Election and referendum articles with incomplete results